Sci Fi Universal was a Romanian channel that launched on December 1, 2007, as Schi Fi Channel, and was closed in 2012. It was available on cable and satellite television. On October 14, 2010, it changed its name to Sci Fi Universal.

Programming

Battlestar Galactica
Dark Angel
Charmed
Flash Gordon
Angel
Star Trek

External links
Official website

Syfy
Defunct television channels in Romania
2007 establishments in Romania
2012 disestablishments in Romania
Television channels and stations established in 2007
Television channels and stations disestablished in 2012
Science fiction television channels